Mark McLennan (born 28 April 1991) is a Scottish professional footballer who plays as a right back for Irvine Meadow in the Scottish Junior Football Association, West Region. He has previously played in the Scottish Premier League for St Mirren.

Career
McLennan began his career with St Mirren, where he also spent a loan spell at Stenhousemuir. On 13 May 2011, McLennan was informed he would not be offered a new contract at St Mirren, and would leave the club at the end of the 2010–11 season.

He spent two seasons with Irvine Meadow before signing for Pollok in June 2013. McLennan returned to Meadow for a second spell in June 2014, before returning to Pollok in February 2015. McLennan retraced his steps yet again to sign with Irvine Meadow for a third time in July 2016.

References

1991 births
Living people
Scottish footballers
St Mirren F.C. players
Irvine Meadow XI F.C. players
Stenhousemuir F.C. players
Pollok F.C. players
Scottish Premier League players
Scottish Football League players
Association football fullbacks
Scottish Junior Football Association players